Delimir Bajić (born 28 March 1983) is a Bosnian-Herzegovinian footballer who plays for FK Borac Banja Luka in the Premier League of Bosnia and Herzegovina.

Club career

Youth career
Born and raised in Bijeljina, SFR Yugoslavia, Delimir began his career as a football player when he was just 11 years old with Velika Obarska-based FK Mladost Velika Obarska.

Mladost Velika Obarska
Delimir continued playing with his parent team as he became a permanent member of the first team squad of the Velika Obarska-based club in 1999.

Radnik Bijeljina
After a long 8-year spell with the Bosnian club, in 2002 he moved back to his hometown Bijeljina where he signed a contract with FK Radnik Bijeljina. In his 5-year spell at the Bijeljina-based club, he also helped his team achieve the runners-up position in the 2006-07 Republika Srpska Cup.

Velež Mostar
In 2007, he signed a one-year contract with one of Bosnia and Herzegovina's top most club, Mostar-based FK Velež Mostar.

Željezničar Sarajevo
In 2008, he moved to the capital city of Bosnia and Herzegovina, Sarajevo where he signed a two-year contract with FK Željezničar Sarajevo. In his first season with the Sarajevo-based club, he made 12 appearances in the 2008–09 Premier League of Bosnia and Herzegovina. He made his first appearance in the 2009–10 Premier League of Bosnia and Herzegovina on 12 September 2009 in a 0-0 draw against NK Travnik and scored his first goal on 21 March 2010 in a 1-1 draw against HŠK Zrinjski Mostar. He scored 2 goals in 15 appearances in the 2009-10 season helping his club to win the 2009–10 Premier League of Bosnia and Herzegovina and the 2009–10 Bosnia and Herzegovina Football Cup.

Nassaji Mazandaran
He first moved out of Bosnia and Herzegovina in 2010 to Iran where he signed a one-year contract with Azadegan League club, Nassaji Mazandaran F.C. He scored his first goal for the club on 19 November 2010 in a 2-0 win over Shirin Faraz F.C. and scored another on 25 February 2011 in a 3-0 win over Iranjavan F.C.

Olympiakos Nicosia
In 2011, he moved back to Europe and more accurately to Cyprus where he signed a one-year contract with Cypriot First Division club, Olympiakos Nicosia. He made his Cypriot First Division debut on 10 September 2011 in a 1-1 draw against AEK Larnaca F.C. and scored his first goal on 11 December 2011 in a 3-1 win over Ermis Aradippou He scored 4 goals in 28 appearances for the Nicosia-based club in the 2011–12 Cypriot First Division and also made 3 appearances in the 2011–12 Cypriot Cup which included a 2-0 win over Omonia Aradippou in the second leg of the quarter-finals, a 0-1 loss against Ethnikos Achna FC in the first leg of the semi-finals and a 0-0 draw in the return leg of the semi-finals.

Sloboda Užice
In 2012, he moved to Serbia where he signed a one-year contract with Serbian SuperLiga club, FK Sloboda Užice. He made his Serbian SuperLiga debut on 27 February 2013 in a 2-2 draw against ŽFK Spartak Subotica. He made 15 appearances in the 2012–13 Serbian SuperLiga. He made his first appearance in the 2013–14 Serbian SuperLiga on 10 August 2013 in a 1-1 draw against the same club ŽFK Spartak Subotica. He made 5 appearances in the 2013-14 season.

Back to Mladost Velika Obarska
In 2014, he returned to Bosnia and Herzegovina and on 11 February 2014 he signed a six-month contract with his parent club, Mladost Velika Obarska. He made his first appearance of the 2013–14 Premier League of Bosnia and Herzegovina on 1 March 2014 in a 1-0 win over FK Borac Banja Luka and scored his first goal on 30 March 2014 in a 2-0 win over NK Zvijezda Gradačac. He scored 1 goal in 9 appearances in the 2013–14 season of Premier League of Bosnia and Herzegovina. He also made 2 appearances in the 2013–14 Bosnia and Herzegovina Football Cup which included a 0-1 loss against HŠK Zrinjski Mostar in the first leg of the quarter-finals and a 5-1 loss in the return leg of the quarter-finals.

Rad
In July 2014, he returned to Serbia and on 1 July 2014, he signed a six-month contract with another Serbian SuperLiga club, FK Rad. He made his debut for the club on 23 August 2014 in a 6-1 win over FK Voždovac. He made 9 appearances for the Belgrade-based club in the 2014–15 Serbian SuperLiga. He also made 2 appearances in the 2014–15 Serbian Cup, one in a 1-0 win over Red Star Belgrade in the Second Round and another in a 1-0 loss against FK Partizan in the quarter-finals.

Saham
On 16 January 2015, he signed a six-month contract with 2014 GCC Champions League runners-up Saham SC. He made 5 appearances in the 2014–15 Oman Professional League.

Later career
After Saham, he again played for Mladost Velika Obarska, again Radnik Bijeljina and FK Zvijezda 09.

Since July 2018, Bajić has been playing for FK Borac Banja Luka in the First League of the Republika Srpska. With Borac, he won the 2018–19 First League of RS title and got promoted back to the Premier League of Bosnia and Herzegovina.

Personal life
His older brother, Branimir Bajić is a retired footballer who most of his career spent playing in Serbia and Germany.

Career statistics

Honours

Player

Club
Radnik Bijeljina
Republika Srpska Cup (Runner-up): 2006–07

Željezničar Sarajevo
Bosnian Premier League: 2009–10

Zvijezda 09
First League of RS: 2017–18

Borac Banja Luka
First League of RS: 2018–19

References

External links
Delimir Bajić at Goal.com

Delimir Bajić - EUROSPORT
Delimir Bajić - soccermanager
Delimir Bajić - THE PLAYERS' AGENT
Delimir Bajić - WhoScored?com
Delimir Bajić - Persian League
Delimir Bajić - YouTube

1983 births
Living people
People from Bijeljina
Serbs of Bosnia and Herzegovina
Association football defenders
Bosnia and Herzegovina footballers
FK Mladost Velika Obarska players
FK Radnik Bijeljina players
FK Velež Mostar players
FK Željezničar Sarajevo players
Nassaji Mazandaran players
Olympiakos Nicosia players
FK Sloboda Užice players
FK Rad players
Saham SC players
FK Zvijezda 09 players
FK Borac Banja Luka players
Premier League of Bosnia and Herzegovina players
Azadegan League players
Cypriot First Division players
Serbian SuperLiga players
Oman Professional League players
First League of the Republika Srpska players
Bosnia and Herzegovina expatriate footballers
Expatriate footballers in Iran
Bosnia and Herzegovina expatriate sportspeople in Iran
Expatriate footballers in Cyprus
Bosnia and Herzegovina expatriate sportspeople in Cyprus
Expatriate footballers in Serbia
Bosnia and Herzegovina expatriate sportspeople in Serbia
Expatriate footballers in Oman
Bosnia and Herzegovina expatriate sportspeople in Oman